The Colombia women's national under-17 football team represents Colombia in international women's football at under-17 competitions and are controlled by the Colombian Football Federation. They are a member of the CONMEBOL.

In 2022, they were winners of the Women's Revelations Cup in Mexico, and later runner-up of 2022 FIFA U-17 Women's World Cup.

Schedule and results

2016

2018

2022

Current squad
The following 22 players were named for the 2018 South American Under-17 Women's Football Championship.

Previous squads
2008 FIFA U-17 Women's World Cup
2012 FIFA U-17 Women's World Cup
2014 FIFA U-17 Women's World Cup

Honours
South American Under-17 Women's Football Championship:
Champions (1): 2008
Runners-up (2): 2013, 2018
Third place (1): 2012
Fourth place (1): 2016

Competitive record
*Draws include knockout matches decided on penalty kicks.
**Gold background colour indicates that the tournament was won.
***Red border colour indicates tournament was held on home soil.

 Champions   Runners-up  Third Place   Fourth place

FIFA U-17 Women's World Cup

South American Under-17 Women's Football Championship

References

External links
FCF Official website
FIFA profile

F
Women's national under-17 association football teams